Martin Dwars (born 17 December 1987) is a German retired goalkeeper.

See also
Football in Germany
List of football clubs in Germany

References

External links
Profile at FC Carl Zeiss Jena
Dwars nur kurz dank Nulle

1987 births
Living people
German footballers
FC Carl Zeiss Jena players
Association football goalkeepers
3. Liga players
1. FC Neubrandenburg 04 players
Sportspeople from Jena